The 1984 Chicago White Sox season was the White Sox's 84th season in the major leagues, and their 85th season overall. They finished with a record of 74-88, good enough for 5th place in the American League West, 10 games behind the 1st place Kansas City Royals.

The Sox' 1984 season is most famous for a 25-inning game on May 8, 1984, against the Milwaukee Brewers. The game was suspended after 17 innings at 1 a.m. It was completed the following night, with the White Sox winning 7-6 on Harold Baines's walk-off home run.

Offseason 
 November 21, 1983: Fran Mullins was traded by the White Sox to the Cincinnati Reds for Steve Christmas.
 December 2, 1983: Jerry Koosman was signed as a free agent by the White Sox.
 December 5, 1983: The White Sox sent a player to be named later to the Philadelphia Phillies for Ron Reed. The White Sox completed the deal by sending Jerry Koosman to the Phillies on February 15, 1984
 December 5, 1983: Bert Roberge was signed as a free agent by the White Sox.
 January 20, 1984: Tom Seaver was chosen by the White Sox from the New York Mets as a free agent compensation pick.
 March 1, 1984: Jim Kern was released by the Chicago White Sox.
 March 27, 1984: Norberto Martin was signed by the White Sox as an amateur free agent.

Regular season 
 August 4, 1984: Bobby Meacham and Dale Berra of the New York Yankees were both tagged out at home by White Sox catcher Carlton Fisk.

Season standings

Record vs. opponents

Opening Day lineup 
 Rudy Law, CF
 Carlton Fisk, C
 Harold Baines, RF
 Greg Luzinski, DH
 Tom Paciorek, 1B
 Ron Kittle, LF
 Vance Law, 3B
 Scott Fletcher, SS
 Julio Cruz, 2B
 LaMarr Hoyt, P

Notable transactions 
 May 23, 1984: Jamie Quirk was signed as a free agent by the White Sox.
 June 21, 1984: The White Sox traded a player to be named later to the Cleveland Indians for Dan Spillner. The White Sox completed the trade by sending Jim Siwy to the Indians on June 26.
 July 18, 1984: Roy Smalley acquired by the White Sox from the New York Yankees for players to be named later. The White Sox sent Doug Drabek and Kevin Hickey to the New York Yankees to complete the trade on August 13.
 September 24, 1984: Jamie Quirk was purchased by the Indians from the White Sox.

Roster

Game log

Regular season

|-style=background:#fbb
| 2 || April 6 || 1:30p.m. CST || Tigers || 2–3 || Wilcox (1–0) || Dotson (0–1) || Hernández (1) || 2:51 || 42,692 || 1–1 || L1
|-style=background:#fbb
| 3 || April 7 || 12:50p.m. CST || Tigers || 0–4 || Morris (2–0) || Bannister (0–1) || – || 2:44 || 24,616 || 1–2 || L2
|-style=background:#fbb
| 4 || April 8 || 1:30p.m. CST || Tigers] || 3–7 || López (1–0) || Seaver (0–1) || – || 3:17 || 20,478 || 1–3 || L3
|-style=background:#fbb
| 11 || April 20 || 6:35p.m. CST || @ Tigers || 2–3 || López (2–0) || Reed (0–1) || – || 2:36 || 33,554 || 5–6 || L1
|-style=background:#fbb
| 12 || April 21 || 1:15p.m. CST || @ Tigers || 1–4 || Rozema (1–0) || Hoyt (2–1) || Bair (1) || 2:35 || 34,395 || 5–7 || L2
|-style=background:#fbb
| 13 || April 22 || 12:30p.m. CST || @ Tigers || 1–9 || Berenguer (1–0) || Brennan (0–1) || – || 2:58 || 10,603 || 5–8 || L3
|-

|-

|-

|-style=background:#cfc
| 78 || July 2 || 7:20p.m. CDT || Tigers || 7–1 || Bannister (5–6) || Rozema (4–1) || – || 2:29 || 32,768 || 38–40 || W1
|-style=background:#cfc
| 79 || July 3 || 7:30p.m. CDT || Tigers || 9–5 || Seaver (7–6) || Morris (12–5) || Reed (4) || 2:42 || 43,094 || 39–40 || W2
|-style=background:#cfc
| 80 || July 4 || 6:05p.m. CDT || Tigers || 8–2 || Dotson || Wilcox || – || 2:34 || 37,665 || 40–40 || W3
|-style=background:#bbbfff
|colspan="12"|55th All-Star Game in San Francisco, CA
|-style=background:#fbb
| 90 || July 16 || 6:35p.m. CDT || @ Tigers || 1–7 || Abbott (3–2) || Hoyt (8–10) || – || 2:29 || 41,935 || 45–45 || L2
|-style=background:#fbb
| 91 || July 17 || 6:35p.m. CDT || @ Tigers || 2–3 || Petry (12–4) || Nelson (1–2) || Hernández (17) || 2:03 || 34,579 || 45–46 || L3
|-style=background:#cfc
| 92 || July 18 || 6:35p.m. CDT || @ Tigers || 10–6 || Bannister (7–6) || Morris (12–6) || Agosto (3) || 2:59 || 39,051 || 46–46 || W1
|-

|-

|-

|- style="text-align:center;"
| Legend:       = Win       = Loss       = PostponementBold = White Sox team member

Player stats

Batting 
Note: G = Games played; AB = At bats; R = Runs scored; H = Hits; 2B = Doubles; 3B = Triples; HR = Home runs; RBI = Runs batted in; BB = Base on balls; SO = Strikeouts; AVG = Batting average; SB = Stolen bases

Pitching 
Note: W = Wins; L = Losses; ERA = Earned run average; G = Games pitched; GS = Games started; SV = Saves; IP = Innings pitched; H = Hits allowed; R = Runs allowed; ER = Earned runs allowed; HR = Home runs allowed; BB = Walks allowed; K = Strikeouts

Farm system 

LEAGUE CHAMPIONS: Appleton

Notes

References 
 1984 Chicago White Sox at Baseball Reference

Chicago White Sox seasons
Chicago White Sox season
Chicago White Sox